The 2006 FIA GT Oschersleben 500 km was the third race for the 2006 FIA GT Championship season.  It took place on July 2, 2006.

Official results
Class winners in bold.  Cars failing to complete 70% of winner's distance marked as Not Classified (NC).

Statistics
 Pole Position – #1 Vitaphone Racing Team – 1:21.520
 Average Speed – 151.72 km/h

External links

 Official Results

O
FIA GT